The Black Knight appears in various forms in Arthurian legend.

 A supernatural Black Knight is summoned by Sir Calogrenant (Cynon ap Clydno in Welsh mythology) in the tale of Yvain, the Knight of the Lion. The Black Knight bests Calogrenant, but the Black Knight is later killed by Ywain (Owain mab Urien) when he attempts to complete the quest that Calogrenant failed.
 Perhaps the first mention of a Black Knight by name is in Raoul de Houdenc's La Vengeance Raguidel (early 13th century), where Noir Chevalier is first mentioned in line 633.
 The eponymous protagonist of Morien wears black armour and bears a black shield, in addition to having black skin, and as such is occasionally referred to as "the black knight".
 In Sir Perceval of Galles (written in the early 14th century), the Black Knight jealously tied his wife to a tree after hearing she had exchanged rings with Perceval. Perceval defeated the black knight and explained that it was an innocent exchange.
 A black knight is also mentioned in Le Morte d'Arthur: The Tale of Sir Gareth (Book IV) as having been killed by Gareth when he was traveling to rescue Lyonesse.
 A black knight is the son of Tom a' Lincoln and Anglitora (the daughter of Prester John) in Richard Johnson's Arthurian romance, Tom a Lincoln. Through Tom, he is a grandson of King Arthur's, though his proper name is never given. He killed his mother after hearing from his father's ghost that she had murdered him. He later joined the Faerie Knight, his half-brother, in adventures.
 Brunor the Black, the father and son bearing the same name in the Prose Tristan and some other works.
 An alias of Sir Lancelot in which Sir Galehaut first knows him by during the Lancelot-Grail cycle.

See also
Black knight
Black Knight (Monty Python)

References

Arthurian characters
Fictional knights
King Arthur's family